The episodes of the 2008 Japanese anime series  are directed by Kunihisa Sugishima and animated by J.C.Staff. The anime is an adaptation of  Yuhki Kamatani's Nabari no Ou manga, which was first serialized in the Japanese shōnen manga magazine Monthly GFantasy in 2004. The story revolves around Rokujo Miharu, a 14-year-old student who unknowingly possesses a powerful hijutsu within him, and his introduction into the hidden ninja world of Nabari upon his power's activation.

It first began airing on Japan's terrestrial television network TV Tokyo on April 6, 2008; airing on Sundays from 01:30 to 02:00 (JST). It also aired on other Japanese networks such as TV Aichi and TV Osaka, though it aired first on TV Tokyo. It contains a total of twenty-six episodes.

On August 19, 2008 Funimation, on the behalf of d-rights, sent cease and desist orders to the fansub groups who were subtitling the series, to prevent copyright infringement. On December 25, 2008, Funimation announced they licensed the series for an English language release.

Three pieces of theme music are used for the episodes: one opening theme and two ending themes. The opening theme is "Crawl", performed and arranged by Veltpunch, with the lyrics and composition by Hidenori Naganuma. The ending theme up to the sixteenth episode is "Hikari" by Elisa, with lyrics by Emi Nishida. From the sixteenth episode to the end,  by Anamu & Maki is used. Veltpunch and Elisa released the singles for "Crawl" and "Hikari" on May 21, 2008, and Anamu & Maki released the single for "Aru ga Mama" on September 3, 2008.

Nine DVD compilations of the series, all containing three episodes except for the first compilation (two episodes), have been released by Geneon Entertainment between July 25, 2008, and March 25, 2009. Funimation released the English language adaption of the anime series in two DVD sets. The first was released on September 22, 2009, and the second on November 24 of the same year.

Episode list

References
General

Specific

External links
 Nabari no Ou official anime site 
 Nabari no Ou at TV Tokyo 

Nabari no Ou